Gideon Daniel Searle (February 13, 1846 Randolph County, Indiana - January 22, 1917 Chicago, Illinois) was a druggist and the founder of pharmaceutical company G.D. Searle, LLC.

The company was founded in Omaha, Nebraska in 1888, moved to Chicago in 1910 before moving to Skokie, Illinois.  The company was acquired by Monsanto in 1987 for $2.7 billion. His father Herman Searle helped establish a Congregational church.

References

1846 births
1917 deaths
Businesspeople from Chicago
People from Randolph County, Indiana
Pharmaceutical company founders
American company founders
19th-century American businesspeople